Rochelle Zell Jewish High School (RZJHS), formerly Chicagoland Jewish High School (CJHS), (Rochelle Zell), located 25 miles northwest of downtown Chicago, is a private, full-day, co-educational high school for primarily Jewish students from grades nine to twelve. Rochelle Zell first opened its doors in 2001 to 26 students.

History
Rochelle Zell Jewish High School opened in 2001 as Chicagoland Jewish High School, with 26 students: 23 freshmen and 3 sophomores. In the 2005–2006 school year, 94 students attended Rochelle Zell, and the number increased to 132 students in the 2007–2008 school year, along with many new faculty members. Due to growth in its student body, Rochelle Zell moved from its Morton Grove campus to a high school in Deerfield in Fall 2007.

In 2015, the school received a donation from the Zell Family Foundation and subsequently changed its name to Rochelle Zell Jewish High School.

For the 2019–2020 school year, enrollment was nearly 180 students drawn from over 20 communities throughout Chicago and its suburbs. Roughly three-quarters of current students advance to Rochelle Zell from Jewish day schools. The remaining students attend local public and private schools before transferring to Rochelle Zell.

Curriculum
Rochelle Zell Jewish High School offers a dual curriculum of general studies and Jewish studies. It is affiliated with the Center for Jewish Day Schools, and its student body includes students from all streams of Judaism. Each school day includes a morning Shacharit prayer service and an optional afternoon Minchah service.

Athletics 
Rochelle Zell is a member of the Chicago Prep Conference (CPC) and offers a variety of sports, such as baseball, basketball, cross country, golf, soccer, swimming, tennis, volleyball, and wrestling. The Rochelle Zell boys' basketball team were CPC division champions in the 2016–2017 season and IHSA regional champions in 2010, 2013, 2014, and 2019. In 2013 the boys' basketball team became the first Jewish high school in Illinois to compete in an IHSA sectional championship. The boys' cross country team won CPC championships from 2010 through 2017, while the girls' team won the CPC championships in 2010, 2011, and 2019. The girls' soccer team won CPC championships in 2015, 2016, and 2019. The boys' soccer team won their first CPC championship in 2018. The girls' volleyball team won the 2012 IHSA regional championship. The boys' volleyball team won the CPC in 2012 and 2018 and the CPC tournament in 2017 and 2018.

The bowling team was cut in the 2019–2020 academic year.

References

External links
 

Conservative Jewish day schools
Jewish day schools in Illinois
Educational institutions established in 2001
Deerfield, Illinois
Private high schools in Cook County, Illinois
2001 establishments in Illinois